Khotmyzhsk is a rural locality (a settlement) in Grayvoronsky District, Belgorod Oblast, Russia. The population was 500 as of 2010. There are 7 streets.

Geography 
Khotmyzhsk is located 16 km east of Grayvoron (the district's administrative centre) by road. Chapayevsky is the nearest rural locality.

References 

Rural localities in Grayvoronsky District